Buena Vista is a rural barrio in the municipality of Hatillo, Puerto Rico. Its population in 2010 was 2,490.

See also

 List of communities in Puerto Rico

References

External links

Barrios of Hatillo, Puerto Rico